Kaltenberger is a German surname. Notable people with the surname include:

Anton Kaltenberger (1904–?), Austrian bobsledder
Dmitry Kaltenberger (born 1976), Kazakh sprint canoer 
Eduard Kaltenberger, West German bobsledder

German-language surnames